James Culleton is a Canadian contemporary multimedia artist and designer based in Saint Boniface, a city ward of Winnipeg, Manitoba. He specializes in blind-contour drawing and sculpture, and his work has been exhibited across Canada and into the United States.

Education

Culleton received a BFA (Honours) from the University of Manitoba in 1999. His teachers included Diana Thorneycroft and Diane Whitehouse, among others.

Work

Culleton produces mural and chalkboard art, oil and acrylic on canvas and blind contour drawings in pencil and ink, as well as water-jet steel sculpture and multi-media installations. As a designer, Culleton has designed large furniture pieces for EQ3, The Pinnacle Seating Studio, and Palliser Furniture. He has also recorded five albums as a roots-based singer-songwriter, released two volumes of themed line drawings, and is active as a public speaker, writer, teacher, and arts supporter.

Special Projects & Public Art
West End Cultural Centre facade:  Large-scale steel sculptures of musical instruments featured on the facade of the West End Cultural Centre in Winnipeg, MB--a commission completed in 2010.

West End Cultural Centre facade:  Large-scale steel sculptures of musical instruments featured on the facade of the West End Cultural Centre in Winnipeg, MB--a commission completed in 2010.
Winnipeg Folk Festival Labyrinths:  Mowed grass labyrinths on the grounds of the Winnipeg Folk Festival in Bird's Hill Park, MB, produced annually since 2007. McCanna House Residency Project:  Multimedia exhibit at the North Dakota Museum of Art that included drawings, paintings, photos, a nine-track album featuring music and performances by the artist, and a series of music videos starring Uncle Charlie, a life-sized puppet produced through collaboration with puppeteer Curtis Wiebe. Grand Forks, ND. 2015.

Crokicurl: painted ice installation combining the sport of curling with the board game crokinole, at The Forks, Winnipeg, MB. Feb. 2017.

Canada Day Viking Ship: floating barge of recycled materials and animated LED light, built in partnership with Gimli High School for Canada 150 celebrations. Gimli, MB. July 2017.

Tiny House on the Prairie Art Residency: Kelwood, MB. Aug. 2017.

Aviary 3.0: sound and sculpture installation of wooden birds paired with motion sensor-activated bird calls, one of six winners in the Art Gallery of Southwestern Manitoba's 2018 Winter Garden project. Brandon, MB. 2018. Another version of this installation, Aviary 4.0, created by Culleton and artist Michael Koch-Schulte using electro-luminescent birds and sound houses focused on crow and raven calls, was included at the North Dakota Museum of Art's bi-annual auction. Grand Forks, ND. Feb. 2018.

Snowplaces: snow-sculptured winter living room installations featuring "snofas," log end tables, and other furnishings constructed to evoke the idea of home in the outdoors. Created as part of Riding Mountain National Park's Winter Adventure Weekend. Wasagaming, MB. Feb. 2018.

Birch Tree Mural: birch tree forest-inspired mural on north-facing side of Club Regent Casino. At 60 feet tall x 500 feet wide, the mural is the largest in Manitoba. Winnipeg, MB. July 2018.

Smithville Legacy Portraits: large-scale mural of historical community leaders. A commission from the City of Smithville upon receipt of a grant from the National Endowment for the Arts. Smithville, TX. Nov. 2018. Part II of this project was completed in Apr. 2019, via a grant from the Texas Commission on the Arts.

conFluENCE, with Michael Koch-Schulte: water-jet cut steel fence with internal lighting. On-site installation at Hargrave Place, Winnipeg, MB. Dec. 2018.

There's Snowplace Like Home, with Chris Pancoe and Jakobi Heinrichs: snow sculptures highlighting selected species at risk within Riding Mountain National Park. Wasagaming, MB. Feb. 2019. 

Sun Spectrums: rainbow-themed mural commissioned by Brandon Downtown Development Corporation, Brandon Neighbourhood Renewal Corporation, and City of Brandon. Brandon, MB. May 2019.

Transcona Welcome Mats: three sidewalk murals commissioned by Transcona Biz Improvement Zone. Winnipeg, MB. July 2019.

Zoo Lights Festival, with Mike Friesen and Michael Koch-Schulte: animal-themed light installations at Assiniboine Park Zoo. Winnipeg, MB. Jan. 2020.

The Jeep!: Styrofoam replica of World War II jeep commissioned by Princess Auto. Winnipeg, MB. Jan. 2020.

The Wheel: large-scale metal art sculpture erected as part of the Dawson Trail Art and Heritage Tour in southern Manitoba, Nov. 2022

Collections

James Culleton Designs produces large and small-scale textile and fabric pieces based on Culleton's art.

Awards and distinctions

2021: Support - Adapt Grant for Media Arts; Music; Visual arts, Manitoba Arts Council

2021: Individual Artist Grant for Artists Working in All Artistic Disciplines, Winnipeg Arts Council

2018: W. Cliff Packer Memorial Award at the Open Juried Competition and Exhibition of the Manitoba Society of Artists for the piece "Forks River Trail."

2015: Pinnacle Award from the American Society of Furniture Designers in the category of motion furniture  for his M1 series, designed for Palliser Furniture. 2015: EQ3 Generation Art award for textile design, used to produce limited-edition pillows, ottomans, and napkins sold in support of the Michaëlle Jean Foundation.

2005: Bourse en Arts Visuels from the Conseil des Arts et des Lettres du Québec, awarded for research and creation in architecture, media arts, visual arts, and craftsmanship.

Exhibitions

Je suis ici/I Am Here: La Maison des Artistes, St. Boniface, MB. Oct. 8 - 20, 2020

Vanished Days: Prairie Fusion Arts & Entertainment Centre, Portage la Prairie, MB. Feb. 18 - Mar. 28, 2020

Lyrical Lines: Drawings by James Culleton: Wayne Arthur Gallery, St. Boniface, MB. Feb. 5 - 20, 2020

Drawings and Watercolours of Transcona: Transcona Funeral Chapel, Winnipeg, MB. June 8, 2019

Dear Margery: North Dakota Museum of Art, Grand Forks, ND. Sept. 24, 2016 - Jan. 15, 2017

Perjinkities: Sketchbook Drawing Exhibition: Art City, Inc., Winnipeg, MB. Sept. 20 - Oct. 20, 2007

Contouring Quebec: Portage and District Arts Centre, Portage la Prairie, MB. June 2008

Workshops and Classes 
2018-present: Instructor at Winnipeg Art Gallery

2017-present: Instructor at Forum Art Centre, Winnipeg, MB

2016-2021: Instructor in Graphic Design and Manual Writing and Design, Continuing Education Department, Red River College, Winnipeg, MB

Publications

Books

Contouring Quebec, c2009.Lyrical Lines, c2011McCanna House c2016

Albums

The Minglers [self-titled] c2001Brokenhead c2003Ca va bien, today? c2009Memento, c2012Vanished Days, c2016At Christmas Time, c2018Spooky Songs (with the Coffin Bangers, featuring Al Simmons), c2019Unusual Friendships, c2020Superfun, c2022

References

External links
James Culleton Designs

Artists from Winnipeg
People from Saint Boniface, Winnipeg
Living people
University of Manitoba alumni
Year of birth missing (living people)